General is the title of the international leader and Chief Executive Officer (CEO) of the Salvation Army, a Christian denomination with extensive charitable social services that gives quasi-military rank to its ministers (who are therefore known as officers). The General is elected by the High Council of The Salvation Army and serves a term of five years, which may be extended to seven years. Brian Peddle, the current general, assumed the position in August 2018 upon the retirement of André Cox. The organisation's founder, William Booth, was the first and longest-serving general. There have been 21 generals as of 2018.

History and procedures for election

Usage of the term "general" began with the founder of The Salvation Army, William Booth. His wife, Catherine Booth, the organisation's co-founder, became known as the "Mother" of The Salvation Army. General Booth served as general until his death in 1912; Booth selected his son, Bramwell Booth as his successor. It was William Booth's intention to have each general choose his successor, but the Salvation Army Act of 1931 passed by the Parliament of the United Kingdom requires that each general is selected by the High Council of The Salvation Army. Every general since Bramwell Booth has been selected by the High Council. In accordance with the Salvation Army Act of 1931, a general must "retire" at age 68 and may serve as long as seven years. The general is elected by the High Council when his predecessor retires or dies (known within the Salvation Army as being promoted to Glory). William Booth was the only general to die in office. The High Council is composed of the Chief of the Staff, all active commissioners, except the spouse of the incumbent general, and all territorial commanders. The High Council may also remove a general from office for violations of his "covenant to God", disability, or the inability to fulfill his duties, though this has never happened. 

The officer of the Salvation Army who is elected general is the worldwide spiritual leader of the Salvation Army and the chief executive officer of the organization. The general has a role that is similar to the Pope's role within the Catholic Church. Since The Salvation Army maintains a hierarchical, quasi-military structure, all appointments and regulations are issued under the general's authority. 

Three women have been elected General of the Salvation Army: Evangeline Booth, William Booths's daughter, in 1934, Eva Burrows in 1986, and Linda Bond in 2011. 

On January 31, 2011, after 10 days of meetings which began on January 21, 2011, the 17th High Council elected Linda Bond as the 19th General of  The Salvation Army. Bond was the third woman to hold the post and the fourth Canadian. This election was handled by the largest High Council in history and was especially significant due to the number of women delegates (57) outnumbering the number of men delegates (52).

On 3 August 2013 the then-Commissioner André Cox was elected by the High Council of 2013 as the 20th General of The Salvation Army. The High Council of 2018 selected Brian Peddle as Cox's successor in May 2018; he took office in August 2018.

List of living retired Generals 
As of March 2022, there are four retired generals living. The most recent general to die was John Larsson on 18 March 2022. 

Paul Rader
Shaw Clifton
Linda Bond
André Cox

Leadership
The general serves as the Chief executive officer (CEO) of The Salvation Army at the international level, but the organization is divided into many subunits controlled by other individuals. For instance, Commissioner David Hudson, appointed by Cox, serves as the CEO of The Salvation Army of the United States.

Generals of The Salvation Army

Timeline
Below is a timeline of Salvation Army Generals' terms in office.

Notes

References

External links
 

The Salvation Army
Methodist ecclesiastical offices